(+)-γ-Cadinene synthase (EC 4.2.3.92) is an enzyme with systematic name (2E,6E)-farnesyl-diphosphate diphosphate-lyase ((+)-γ-cadinene-forming). This enzyme catalyses the following chemical reaction

 (2E,6E)-farnesyl diphosphate  (+)-γ-cadinene + diphosphate

The enzyme from the melon, Cucumis melo, forms mainly δ- and γ-cadinene.

References

External links 
 

EC 4.2.3